The men's 100 metres event at the 2005 Summer Universiade was held on 15–16 August in Izmir, Turkey.

Medalists

Results

Heats
Wind:Heat 1: -0.9 m/s,  Heat 2: -0.2 m/s,  Heat 3: +1.3 m/s,  Heat 4: +0.3 m/s,  Heat 5: -0.2 m/s,  Heat 6: +1.1 m/sHeat 7: -1.3 m/s,  Heat 8: -0.3 m/s,  Heat 9: +0.8 m/s,  Heat 10: -0.1 m/s,  Heat 11: -0.9 m/s

Quarterfinals
Wind:Heat 1: -2.2 m/s,  Heat 2: +0.6 m/s,  Heat 3: +0.2 m/s,  Heat 4: +0.8 m/s,  Heat 5: 0.0 m/s

Semifinals
Wind:Heat 1: -0.4 m/s,  Heat 2: -1.1 m/s

Final
Wind: +0.7 m/s

References

Finals results
Full results

Athletics at the 2005 Summer Universiade
2005